Edward J. McKeever (March 19, 1859 in Brooklyn, New York – April 29, 1925 in New York, New York) was  a construction contractor in Brooklyn in the early 1900s. Ed and his brother Stephen bought half of the Brooklyn Dodgers baseball team from Henry Medicus on January 2, 1912. Together with co-owner Charles Ebbets, they built what became Ebbets Field. McKeever served as Vice-President of the Dodgers until Charles Ebbets died of a heart attack on April 18, 1925. McKeever became team president, but despite previously being in good health, he caught a cold at Ebbets' funeral and died of influenza a little more than a week later. He was buried in Holy Cross Cemetery in Brooklyn.

External links
Dodgers ownership history
Bio of the McKeevers
Dodgers history
NY Times article on the McKeevers purchasing shares of the team

References

Baseball executives
Brooklyn Dodgers owners
Brooklyn Dodgers executives
Major League Baseball team presidents
1859 births
1925 deaths